Batman: Gates of Gotham is a five-issue, monthly comic book limited series published by DC Comics involving the various characters of the Batman franchise. It is written by Scott Snyder and Kyle Higgins, and illustrated by Trevor McCarthy. The first issue was published May 18, 2011.

Publication history

Preview art from the series was released by DC in April 2011, one month before the first issue's release.

Plot summary
The series revolves around a decades-old mystery connected to the founding fathers of Gotham City that comes to light in the present day, leading Batman to assemble a team of detectives to try to unravel the conspiracy. In addition to Batman, the series features Red Robin, Black Bat (Cassandra Cain) and Robin (Damian Wayne) as the main characters.

The series was used as a launching point for several high-profile Batman storylines in 2011, and also touched upon elements introduced in Grant Morrison's The Return of Bruce Wayne limited series.

References

External links
DC Comics

2011 comics debuts
Batman titles
DC Comics limited series
Comics by Scott Snyder